Vilmos Imre (born 27 March 1968 in Székesfehérvár) is a Hungarian handball coach and former handball player. He is coach at Hungarian Handball Academy.

References

1968 births
Living people
Sportspeople from Székesfehérvár
Hungarian male handball players
Hungarian handball coaches